Sekar (Seka) is a minor Austronesian language of the north coast of the Bomberai Peninsula.

References

Central Malayo-Polynesian languages
Languages of western New Guinea